Carmen Climent Roca (born February 13, 1996) is a Spanish film, theater and television actress, singer and dancer. She is known for playing María Alcántara in the Spanish television series Cuéntame cómo pasó.

Life and career 

Climent studied and trained in theater and drama in Ánima Eskola School of Drama with Marina Shimanskaya, David Valdelvira and Algis Arlauskas, training as a method actress, under the Stanislavsky-M.Chekhov-Grotowski-Vakhtangov methodology (Russian method), following the methodologies of the Russian classical school. There she coincided with the actors Nerea Elizalde and Julen Guerrero, together with whom she was trained.

Later, she trained in cinema with Richard Sahagún. She was also trained in musical and lyrical singing and classical dance, with Igor Yebra, contemporary dance, jazz dance and tap dance. As a dancer, she has participated in the dance company of Rakel Rodríguez. She studied music and music theory with Roberto Bienzobas.

In 2014 she performed the play A Midsummer Night's Dream by William Shakespeare, a theatrical production at the Campos Elíseos Theatre, directed by Spanish stage director David Valdelvira, together with Nerea Elizalde and Julen Guerrero among other cast members. The stage production was awarded the Buero Vallejo Award (2015), in the XII edition of the awards.

In 2015 she performed the play Dialogues between Chekhov and Bécquer, a theatrical production at the Campos Elíseos Theatre, directed by Russian actress and stage director Marina Shimanskaya, based on the works of Anton Chejov and Gustavo Adolfo Bécquer.

In December 2018, she began to record her performance as María Alcántara in the TV series Cuéntame cómo pasó from La 1.

Filmography

Television

Stage

Awards and nominations

Buero Vallejo Awards

References

External links 
 

1996 births
Living people
People from Bilbao
21st-century Spanish actresses
Spanish film actresses
Spanish television actresses
Spanish stage actresses
Ánima Eskola School of Drama alumni